The 2011 World Judo Cadets Championships is an edition of the World Judo Cadets Championships, organised by the International Judo Federation. It was held in Kyiv, Ukraine from 11 to 14 August 2011.

Medal summary

Medal table

Men's events

Women's events

Source Results

References

External links
 

World Judo Cadets Championships
 U18
World Championships, U18
Sports competitions in Kyiv
Judo competitions in Ukraine
Judo
Judo, World Championships U18
International sports competitions hosted by Ukraine
2010s in Kyiv